Noemi Neubauerová (born 15 December 1999) is a Czech ice hockey player and member of the Czech national team, currently playing with the Providence Friars women's ice hockey program in the Hockey East (HEA) conference of the NCAA Division I. Her college ice hockey career was previosuly played with the Colgate Raiders in the ECAC Hockey conference during 2018 to 2022.

She represented the Czech Republic in the women's ice hockey tournament at the 2022 Winter Olympics in Beijing and at the IIHF Women's World Championships in 2016, 2019, 2021, and 2022.

References

External links
 
 

1999 births
Living people
Colgate Raiders women's ice hockey players
Czech expatriate ice hockey players in the United States
Czech women's ice hockey forwards
Ice hockey players at the 2022 Winter Olympics
Olympic ice hockey players of the Czech Republic
Providence Friars women's ice hockey players
Sportspeople from Kolín
The Frederick Gunn School alumni
21st-century Czech women